"Little Runaway" is a song by British singer Celeste, released on 25 August 2020 through Both Sides and Polydor Records. The song was written by the singer herself with Gary Go and Jamie Hartman, and also features production from TMS and TommyD.

Background
Talking about the song, Celeste said, "'Little Runaway' is a song about losing your faith, even if just momentarily, and seeking answers from spirits and ghosts as nothing seems to make sense on this planet. My favourite line in the song is 'good news I could use some' – I believe everyone has a guardian angel, a protector, and this is me talking to mine. The verses actually started as this saxophone sample we were playing around with and eventually it transformed into the melody. I always play the sax back in my head even though it's not in the song."

Music video
A music video to accompany the release of "Little Runaway" was first released onto YouTube on 25 August 2020. The video was directed by Sophie Jones and shows the singer's image being presented through a series of kaleidoscopic gazes.

Track listing

Credits and personnel
Credits adapted from Tidal.
 TMS – producer
 Tommy Danvers – producer, additional producer, associated performer, keyboards
 Celeste Epiphany Waite – composer, lyricist, associated performer, vocals
 Gary Go – composer, lyricist
 Jamie Hartman – composer, lyricist, associated performer, programming, vocal producer
 Ben Kohn – associated performer, programming
 Kerenza Peacock – associated performer, viola, violin
 Neil Cowley – associated performer, piano
 Peter Kelleher – associated performer, synthesizer
 Rosie Danvers – associated performer, cello, string arranger
 Tom Barnes – associated performer, drums
 Vern Asbury – associated performer, guitar
 Zara Benyounes – associated performer, viola, violin
 John Davis – mastering engineer, studio personnel
 Spike Stent – mixer, studio personnel
 Lewis Wright – recording engineer, studio personnel

Charts

References

2020 songs
2020 singles
Polydor Records singles
Songs written by Tom Barnes (songwriter)
Songs written by Peter Kelleher (songwriter)
Songs written by Ben Kohn
Songs written by Gary Go
Songs written by Jamie Hartman